Yury Vasilyevich Komarov (born 2 August 1954) is a former Russian professional footballer.

Club career
He made his professional debut in the Soviet Second League in 1975 for FC Zenit Izhevsk. He played 1 game in the UEFA Cup 1974–75 for FC Dynamo Moscow.

References

1954 births
Living people
Soviet footballers
Association football defenders
FC Dynamo Moscow players
FC Znamya Truda Orekhovo-Zuyevo players
FC Izhevsk players